Boston Medical Center (BMC) is a non-profit 514-bed academic medical center and safety-net hospital in the South End neighborhood of Boston, Massachusetts. As part of the Boston Medical Center Health System, the hospital provides primary and specialty care to residents of the Greater Boston area. It is also the principal teaching hospital of Boston University Chobanian & Avedisian School of Medicine and home to 66 residency and fellowship training programs

History 
BMC was founded in July 1996 through the merger of Boston City Hospital and Boston University Medical Center. The merger also led to the creation of Boston HealthNet, a network of community health centers associated with BMC, and WellSense Health Plan, a Medicaid Managed Care Organization.

Boston City Hospital was the first municipal hospital in the United States, opening in 1864. Boston University School of Medicine opened in 1873, combining the New England Female Medical College with the medical staff of the Massachusetts Homeopathic Hospital.

BMC’s programming has expanded over the years to better meet the needs of patients. In 2001, BMC opened the Preventive Food Pantry and Teaching Kitchen to provide nutritious, and medically and culturally appropriate, food for patients, the first programs of their kind in the U.S. In 2017, BMC also added a rooftop farm to supply these programs and other hospital areas.

Also in 2017, Boston Medical Center announced that it had received a $25 million gift, the largest in its history and the largest gift for substance use disorders for any hospital, from Eilene and John Grayken. The donation created the Grayken Center for Addiction Medicine at BMC.

In 2021, BMC launched the Health Equity Accelerator, a bold approach that aims to eliminate the race-based inequities that exist throughout the health care industry in the U.S.

From 2015 through 2018, BMC undertook a campus redesign project to update clinical spaces, improve efficiencies, and better serve patients. This project included the closure of the Newton Pavilion and the relocation of the services previously in the building to other parts of the hospital campus. In 2022, BMC began the second part of the campus redesign project to add 70 new inpatient beds, as well as outpatient clinical space.

Location 
Boston Medical Center’s main campus is located in Boston’s historic South End. It serves patients from across the Greater Boston area at the main campus and through programs and services in the communities where its patients live.

Several BMC departments and programs also provide services at sites outside Boston, including the BMC Brockton Behavioral Health Center, which opened in 2022 on a net-zero carbon emissions campus in Brockton, and rehabilitation services (physical therapy and occupational therapy) in Winthrop and Hyde Park.

Patient Care 
BMC offers a full spectrum of care in four primary care practices (Adult Primary Care, Family Medicine, Pediatrics, and Geriatrics) and more than 70 specialties and subspecialties, including seven areas that have been named US News high performers. 

As a Level I Trauma Center, the hospital is the busiest center for trauma and emergency services in New England, and the 11th busiest emergency department in the U.S. It additionally serves as the affiliate hospital for the nationally renowned Boston EMS, which provides emergency care for more than 650,000 nighttime and 1.2 million daytime residents of and visitors to Boston - responding to more than 125,000 calls each year.

BMC provides care for a diverse patient population, with nearly 30% speaking a language other than English as their primary language. Of these patients, almost half speak Spanish, followed by Haitian Creole, Portuguese, Cape Verdean, and Vietnamese. In order to ensure effective communication between the staff and patients, the hospital operates one of the oldest and most extensive interpreter services programs, utilizing 60 professional medical interpreters and language facilitators available to help patients in over 150 languages.

BMC partners with 12 community health centers that provide outreach, prevention, primary care and specialty care, and dental services at sites located throughout Boston and in nearby communities.

Social Services and Programs 
As the largest safety net hospital in New England, BMC is committed to programs that improve patients’ wellbeing outside traditional medical care. These programs support the hospital’s mission to create a healthier Boston and include services such as:

  Birth Sisters, a multicultural doula service that offers women "sister-like" support during pregnancy, childbirth, and the post-partum period
  The Immigrant and Refugee Health Center, which connects immigrant patients with medical, mental health, social service, and community resources
 The Preventive Food Pantry, Teaching Kitchen, and Rooftop Farm, which all help address hunger-related illness and malnutrition
 Programs to address homelessness, including the Elders Living at Home Program, which provides intensive case management for older adults at imminent risk becoming homeless
  Reach Out and Read, a program where pediatricians give books to families with children to promote reading
 StreetCred, a program in the Pediatrics department that helps patients' families build wealth by offering tax preparation, assistance with tax credits and college savings accounts, and other economic services
 Support for victims of violence, as well as their families, and children who have witnessed violence, through programs such as the Violence Intervention Advocacy Program, the Community Violence Response Team, the Domestic Violence Program, and Child Witness to Violence
 Project ASSERT, a nationally recognized, evidence-based program that provides screening and brief intervention for patients in BMC's emergency department whose alcohol and/or substance use was directly implicated in their need for emergency services.

Research 
In 2022, BMC was the 18th largest recipient of funding from the National Institutes of Health among independent U.S. hospitals, receiving over $334.4 million in annual research funding across the medical campus. The hospital’s world-renowned researchers currently oversee 661 research projects, including both laboratory-based research and clinical research programs in a wide variety of areas, including:

  Health equity and health care disparities through the Health Equity Accelerator, which is committed to leveraging the power of research to ensure that we truly interrogate the contributors to adverse outcomes in people of color and implement solutions to these longstanding inequities
  Addiction, through the Grayken Center for Addiction at BMC, a national hub for substance use disorder resources that aims to revolutionize addiction treatment and education, replicate best practices, and provide policy, advocacy, and thought-leadership
 Cardiology, through the Framingham Heart Study, which has helped the medical field obtain much of our current knowledge about heart disease, and the Whitaker Cardiovascular Institute, which has been named a Specialized Center of Research in Hypertension and a Specialized Center of Research in Ischemic Heart Disease by the National Institutes of Health’s Heart, Lung and Blood Institute
 COVID-19, as the leader of MA-CEAL, part of a nationwide initiative funded by the National Institutes of Health whose work includes addressing misinformation gaps and mistrust around COVID-19 and promoting equitable access to clinical research participation
  Regenerative medicine, at the Center for Regenerative Medicine (CReM), which works to address various aspects of developmental biology, stem cells, regeneration and injury, cell lineage specification and disease modeling with a major focus on induced pluripotent stem cells
 Pathology, at the CoRe, a research pathology lab built to utilize the knowledge and expertise of individuals from both the clinical and the research setting
 Amyloidosis, at the BMC Amyloidosis Center, an international leader research on amyloidosis that pioneered the use of high-dose chemotherapy and stem cell transportation for patients with AL amyloidosis

Awards and Accolades 
In 2022, BMC received the following awards and recognitions:

 Awarded Magnet® designation from the American Nurses Credentialing Center, the highest national credential for nursing excellence, quality patient care, and innovations in professional nursing practice
 Ranked as #4 most racially inclusive hospital in the US (and #1 in Massachusetts) by the Lown Institute
 Ranked as #4 most socially responsible hospital in the US (and #1 in Massachusetts) by the Lown Institute
 Named a US News High Performing hospital in maternity care, cancer care, geriatrics, neurology and neurosurgery, pulmonology and lung surgery, and urology
 Designated LGBTQ+ Healthcare Equality Leader by the Human Rights Campaign
 Designated an age-friendly health system by the Institution for Healthcare Improvement, which recognizes BMC as committed to care excellence for older adults
 Named to the 2022 Becker's Healthcare list of top 150 places to work in health care
 Named as one of America’s Best-in-State Employers by Forbes
 Ranked #13 on a list of the Top 100 Women-led Businesses in Massachusetts by the Globe Magazine and The Women's Edge
 Kate Walsh, CEO, named to Modern Healthcare's List of 100 Most Influential People in Healthcare
 Best and Brightest in Wellness Award from the National Association for Business Resources
 WorkWell Massachusetts Award from Healthiest Employers
 The Multiple Sclerosis Center at BMC was named a Center for Comprehensive MS Care

BMC Health System
BMC is a founding partner of the Boston Medical Center Health System, which provides world-class care to all, with an emphasis on health equity, clinical and research excellence, and the treatment of complex conditions through a value based, coordinated continuum of care. BMC Health System includes BMC and five other major entities serving patients and health plan members in Massachusetts and New Hampshire:

  WellSense Health Plan: A Medicaid Managed Care Organization that supports the medical, behavioral health, and prescription drug needs of Medicaid members in MA and NH
 Boston University Medical Group: A group comprising more than 1,000 physicians, advanced practice providers, educators, and researchers across 18 clinical departments at BMC
 Boston HealthNet: A network of 12 community health centers that provide outreach, prevention, primary care and specialty care, and dental services at sites located throughout Boston and in nearby communities
  Boston Accountable Care Organization: A group of health care providers that manages coordinated, high-quality care for certain MassHealth patients in the Boston area with the goal of improving outcomes and lowering costs
 Clearway Health: An organization that partners with hospitals and health systems to build or strengthen their specialty pharmacy programs and improve access to crucial pharmacy care

References

Further reading 
 Ryan, Andrew, "Old morgue finds new life as a clinic for homeless", The Boston Globe, May 31, 2008

External links 
 Boston Medical Center
 Boston University Medical Campus
 Boston Medical Center HealthNet Plan
 Boston Medical Center Documentary By Rachel Gotbaum. WBUR. 2006 audio documentary on the 10th anniversary of the merger, describing history and innovative programs of BMC. (RealAudio)

Hospitals in Boston
Boston University Medical Campus
Teaching hospitals in Massachusetts
Hospitals established in 1996
Non-profit organizations based in Boston
South End, Boston
Trauma centers